The FA Youth Cup 2011–12 was the 60th edition of the FA Youth Cup.

The competition consisted of several rounds and was preceded by a qualifying competition, starting with the preliminary round which was followed by four qualifying rounds for non-League teams. Football League teams entered the draw thereafter, with League One and League Two teams entering at the first round, and Premier League and Championship teams entering in the third round. The competition was won by Chelsea.

Calendar

Fixtures and results

First round

Second round

Third round

Fourth round

Fifth round

Quarter-finals

Semi-finals

|}

First leg

Second leg

Final

First leg

Second leg

See also
 2011–12 Premier Academy League
 2011–12 Premier Reserve League
 2011–12 FA Cup
 2011–12 in English football

References

External links
 The FA Youth Cup at The Football Association official website

FA Youth Cup seasons
FA
Fa Youth Cup, 2011-12